Mendesina carinithorax is a species of beetles in the family Cerambycidae, the only species in the genus Mendesina.

References

Necydalinae
Monotypic Cerambycidae genera

Monotypic beetle genera